Cannery Casino and Hotel is a locals casino in North Las Vegas, Nevada, USA, owned and operated by Boyd Gaming. The Cannery includes an  casino, 201 hotel rooms, an indoor/outdoor venue, Galaxy Movie Theater, five restaurants and three bars.

History 
The Cannery was initially set for a mid-December 2002 opening. By October 2002, more than 5,000 people had been interviewed for nearly 1,000 job positions at the Cannery. That month, the opening was delayed to early January 2003. The delay allowed the owners to save $90,000 in taxes and fees, and also simplified the Cannery's job search. Prior to its opening, Cannery executives chose not to affiliate the hotel with a brand name, which was deemed as expensive and unnecessary.

The Cannery opened on January 2, 2003, with 201 rooms and a  casino. The Cannery is known for its 120-foot smokestack.

In May 2004, the Cannery received final approval for a $35 million expansion project. The expansion took place in 2006, and added  and a 3,571-seat Galaxy Movie Theater. Other additions include a parking garage and new poker room.

The property became part of Boyd Gaming in December 2016 through its acquisition of Cannery Casino Resorts.

Venue 
The Cannery Casino and Hotel houses The Club, an indoor/outdoor entertainment and exhibit venue. The Club features glass doors that can be opened to create an open-air amphitheater/festival site. The Club hosts concerts, exhibits, private and corporate parties and outdoor festivals.

References

External links 
Cannery Casino and Hotel
Cannery Casino Resorts

Buildings and structures in North Las Vegas, Nevada
Casinos in the Las Vegas Valley
Hotels in the Las Vegas Valley
Casinos completed in 2003
Hotel buildings completed in 2003
Hotels established in 2003
Boyd Gaming
Cannery Casino Resorts
Casino hotels